The Federal Reserve of the United States gathers and publishes specific economic data and releases them as a Federal Reserve Statistical Release.

The main categories include:

Principal Economic Indicators
Bank Asset Quality
Bank Assets and Liabilities
Bank Structure Data
Business Finance
Exchange Rates and International Data
Flow of Funds Accounts
Household Finance
Industrial Activity
Interest Rates
Money Stock and Reserve Balances
Other

References

External links
Federal Reserve Board of Governors Statistics: Releases and Historical Data
Historical Statistical Releases on FRASER (Federal Reserve Archival System for Economic Research)
Federal Reserve Board Statistical Release Publication History

Federal Reserve System
Publications of the United States government